Demra is a (metropolitan) Thana  of Dhaka city, The capital of Bangladesh. It consists of Ward No 64,65(part),67,68,69 and 70 of Dhaka South City Corporation.Demra is Situated in The Eastern Border area of Dhaka City.

History 
Demra thana was established in 1973. The thana consists of 6 words & 19 mouzas.

Geography 
It has 102757 units of household and total area 22.4 km2 [2011].

It is bounded by khilgaon and sabujbagh thanas on the north, Sampur thana and Narayanganj sadar upazila on the south, Rupganj upazila on the east, Kadamtali And jatrabari thanas on the west.

Demographics / Population 
According to the 2011 census, Demra has a population of 22,8,69. Male 12,16,05 females 10,46,64. Male to female ratio is 53.83% and 48.28%. John. The literacy rate among the town people is 51.1%.

At the 1991 Bangladesh census, Demra had a population of 521,160, of whom 290,981 were aged 18 or older. Males constituted 56.42% of the population, and females 43.58%. Demra had an average literacy rate of 52.3% (7+ years), against the national average of 32.4%.

Parliament's constituency 
Demra is a part of Dhaka-5 parliamentary constituency. It is one of the 300 constituencies of the National Assembly of Bangladesh. It is the 178th seat of the Jatiya Sangsad in the Dhaka district.

The constituency was created for the first general elections in newly independent Bangladesh, held in 1973.

Ahead of the 2008 general election, the Election Commission redrew constituency boundaries to reflect population changes revealed by the 2001 Bangladesh census. 2008 redistricting altered the boundaries of the constituency.

Notable people 

 Habibur Rahman Mollah (26 January 1942 - 6 May 2020), a Bangladeshi politician, businessman and Member of Parliament.

See also 
 Upazilas of Bangladesh
 Districts of Bangladesh
 Divisions of Bangladesh

References 

Thanas of Dhaka